Weston-super-Mare is a constituency represented in the House of Commons of the UK Parliament since 2005 by John Penrose, a Conservative.

History
The seat was created under the Representation of the People Act 1918.  Its forerunner was the North Somerset division created in 1885.

The by-election of 1934 was triggered by the acceptance of the appointment of Lord Erskine to the position of Governor of Madras Presidency, that of 1958 by the death of Ian Orr-Ewing and that of 1969 by the death of David Webster.

Political history
The seat has alternated in representation between 1992 and 2005: in the election of 1997 the fresh Conservative candidate, Margaret Daly failed to hold the seat which led to Weston Super Mare's first marginal majority since 1923, obtained by Brian Cotter, a Liberal Democrat. Between 1997 and 2010, all the majorities in the constituency were lower than 3,000 votes, remaining strongly marginal and seeing in 2005 Cotter lose the seat to John Penrose. Following the 2015 election however, the seat moved strongly towards the Conservatives, who have increased their share of the vote in every subsequent election. At the 2019 election, Penrose gained a 17,121 over the now second place Labour candidate.

Frontbenchers
Jerry Wiggin was a Minister for the Armed Services from 1981 to 1983.
Brian Cotter was the Liberal Democrat Small Business Spokesman (1997–2005),
John Penrose was appointed the Minister for Tourism and Heritage (2010–2012).

Boundaries	

1918–1950: The Urban Districts of Clevedon, Portishead, and Weston-super-Mare, and the Rural Districts of Axbridge and Long Ashton.

1950–1983: The Borough of Weston-super-Mare, the Urban District of Clevedon, the Rural District of Axbridge, and in the Rural District of Long Ashton the parishes of Kenn, Kingston Seymour, and Yatton.

1983–1997: The District of Woodspring wards of Banwell, Blagdon, Churchill, Congresbury, Hutton, Locking, Weston-super-Mare Ashcombe, Weston-super-Mare East, Weston-super-Mare Ellenborough, Weston-super-Mare North, Weston-super-Mare South, Weston-super-Mare Uphill, Weston-super-Mare West, Winscombe, Wrington, and Yatton.

1997–2010: The District of Woodspring wards of Banwell, Blagdon, Churchill, Congresbury, Hutton, Locking, Weston-super-Mare Ashcombe, Weston-super-Mare East, Weston-super-Mare Ellenborough, Weston-super-Mare North, Weston-super-Mare South, Weston-super-Mare Uphill, Weston-super-Mare West, and Winscombe.

2010–present: The District of North Somerset wards of Banwell and Winscombe, Blagdon and Churchill, Congresbury, Hutton and Locking, Kewstoke, Weston-super-Mare Central, Weston-super-Mare Clarence and Uphill, Weston-super-Mare East, Weston-super-Mare Milton and Old Worle, Weston-super-Mare North Worle, Weston-super-Mare South, Weston-super-Mare South Worle, and Weston-super-Mare West.

The constituency covers the southern half of North Somerset Unitary Authority, including its only town, Weston-super-Mare on the Bristol Channel.

History of boundaries
Changes for 1950
Under the first periodic review the Weston constituency lost the Urban District of Portishead, and most of the Rural District of Long Ashton (excepting the parishes of Kenn, Kingston Seymour, and Yatton) to North Somerset constituency.
Changes for 1983
Under the third periodic review the Weston constituency lost Clevedon to Woodspring constituency, and the parishes now within the Sedgemoor district (under the Local Government Act 1972) to Wells constituency.
Changes for 1997
Under the fourth periodic review the Weston constituency lost Yatton and Wrington to Woodspring constituency.
Changes for 2010
Parliament accepted the Boundary Commission's Fifth Periodic Review of Westminster constituencies by making slight changes to this constituency for the 2010 general election, namely the loss of only 181 electors in Butcombe (in the ward of Wrington, no longer in the seat at all) to North Somerset.

Constituency profile
The town grew as a relatively late-Victorian affluent resort with many green spaces and gardens south of the headland, Sand Point which denotes the sandier beach of the town and of Burnham on Sea relative to northerly shores such as at Clevedon.

Work in tourism and visitor attractions is seasonal but other areas of the economy locally, such as customer services operations, freight, haulage and distribution, social, care, elderly and health services as well as retail, manufacturing and materials/foods processing provide employment.  Workless claimants who were registered jobseekers were in November 2012 lower than the national average of 3.8%, at 3.5% of the population based on a statistical compilation by The Guardian.

Members of Parliament

Elections

Elections in the 2010s

Elections in the 2000s

Elections in the 1990s

Elections in the 1980s

Elections in the 1970s

Elections in the 1960s

Elections in the 1950s

Elections in the 1940s

Elections in the 1930s

Elections in the 1920s

Elections in the 1910s

See also
 List of parliamentary constituencies in Avon

Notes

References

Sources
 The Constitutional Year Book for 1913 (London: National Union of Conservative and Unionist Associations, 1913)
F W S Craig, British Parliamentary Election Results 1832–1885 (2nd edition, Aldershot: Parliamentary Research Services, 1989)
 Michael Kinnear, The British Voter (London: BH Batsford, Ltd, 1968)
 Henry Pelling, Social Geography of British Elections 1885–1910 (London: Macmillan, 1967)
 Frederic A Youngs, jr, Guide to the Local Administrative Units of England, Vol I (London: Royal Historical Society, 1979)

Weston-super-Mare
Constituencies of the Parliament of the United Kingdom established in 1918
Weston-super-Mare
Politics of North Somerset